Emmett Watson's Oyster Bar is a seafood restaurant in Seattle's Pike Place Market, in the U.S. state of Washington. Emmett Watson and Sam Bryant opened the city's first oyster bar on February 18, 1979. The restaurant is now operates by Bryant's son Thurman.

See also 
 List of James Beard America's Classics
 List of oyster bars
 List of restaurants in Seattle
 List of seafood restaurants

References

External links
 

1979 establishments in Washington (state)
Central Waterfront, Seattle
Oyster bars in the United States
Pike Place Market
Restaurants established in 1979
Seafood restaurants in Seattle